Andreas Sieling (born 1964) is a German organist and musicologist.

Life 
Born in Oldenburg, Sieling studied musicology, German studies and journalism (doctorate) in Berlin. In Düsseldorf, he continued his education with organ studies at the Robert Schumann Hochschule Düsseldorf with Hans-Dieter Möller. In Halle, he completed the A exam for church music. Sieling teaches as an honorary professor the organ, performance practice and organ methodology at the Berlin University of the Arts. He has been organist at the Berlin Cathedral since 2005.

Honours 
The church leadership of the Evangelical Church in Berlin, Brandenburg and Silesian Upper Lusatia conferred the title of "Kirchenmusikdirektor" on Andreas Sieling on 24 April 2020. The certificate was presented by General Superintendent  at the service on 15 November 2020 in the Berlin Cathedral.

Recordings 
 Toccata (Berlin Cathedral)
 Französische Romantik (Berlin Cathedral)
  (Grunewaldkirche Berlin)
 Charles Tournemire: Cinq improvisations; op. 16, op. 19, Dix Pièces (Berlin Cathedral)
 Guilmant, Wermann, Lubrich, Dienel, Liszt (Heilig-Geist-Kirche Rostock)
 Jan Janca (Kaiser-Wilhelm-Gedächtniskirche Berlin)
 Alte Meister (Berlin Cathedral)

References

External links 
 
 

German classical organists
Academic staff of the Berlin University of the Arts
Cathedral organists
1964 births
Living people
People from Oldenburg (city)